Sohal Khalsa is a village in Shahkot in Jalandhar district of Punjab State, India. The village is administrated by Sarpanch an elected representative of the village.

Demography 
, The village has a total number of 116 houses and the population of 568 of which 289 are males while 279 are females.  According to the 2011 Census of India, out of the total population of the village 237 people are from Schedule Caste and the village does not have any Schedule Tribe population so far.

See also
List of villages in India

References

External links 
 Tourism of Punjab
 Census of Punjab

Villages in Jalandhar district